The Man-eaters of Tsavo is a semi-autobiographical book written by Anglo-Irish military officer and hunter John Henry Patterson. Published in 1907, it recounts his experiences in East Africa while supervising the construction of a railroad bridge over the Tsavo river in Kenya, in 1898. It is titled after a pair of man-eating lions that terrorized the undertaking for nine-months, until at last their reign of terror was put to an end by Patterson. His recounting of this incident project him to fame, and it remains the subject of debate to this day. It has also been the basis of numerous films, the best known being The Ghost and the Darkness (1996), starring Val Kilmer and Michael Douglas.

Overview 
Following the death of the lions, the book tells of the bridge's completion in spite of additional challenges (such as a fierce flood) as well as many stories concerning local wildlife (including other lions) local tribes, the discovery of the maneaters' cave and various hunting expeditions.

An appendix contains advice to sportsmen visiting British East Africa. The book also includes photographs taken by Patterson at the time which include the railway construction; the workers; local tribes; scenery and wildlife; and the man-eaters.

Several publications about and studies of the man-eating lions of Tsavo have been inspired by Patterson's account.  The book has been adapted to film three times: a monochrome, British film of the 1950s, a 1952 3-D film titled Bwana Devil, and a 1996 color version called The Ghost and the Darkness, where Val Kilmer played the daring engineer who hunts down the lions of Tsavo.

Historicity of the account of the man-eaters 
The Victorian style of the prose may appear today as overwritten;  however, the editor's note to the 1986 reprint claims that the facts suggest that some aspects were actually downplayed, such as the death of Haslem, about which more grisly facts are known. The book describes attacks by two man-eating lions on workers building the Uganda Railway through British East Africa in 1898 and how the pair were eventually killed by Patterson. It was remarkable that 135 people were killed by the man-eaters in less than a year before Patterson managed to kill them (although this number is contested, it is not disproven).

Patterson's 1907 book itself states that "between them [the lions] no less than 28 Indian coolies, in addition to scores of unfortunate African natives of whom no official record was kept" were killed. Later accounts exaggerated this number: 135 'Indian and African artisans and labourers' (Patterson, 1925), '135 armed men' (Patterson & Neiburger, 2000) and 140 (Caputo, 2000). In 2001, Julian Kerbis Peterhans and Tom Gnoske published their definitive paper on man-eating behavior among lions with special reference to the Tsavo situation. They documented between 28 and 31 victims. This lesser number was confirmed in Dr. Bruce Patterson's definitive book The Lions of Tsavo: Exploring the Legacy of Africa's Notorious Man-Eaters. He showed that the greater toll attributed to the lions resulted from a pamphlet written by Colonel Patterson in 1925, stating "these two ferocious brutes killed and devoured, under the most appalling circumstances, 135 Indian and African artisans and laborers employed in the construction of the Uganda Railway."

The skins of the lions may be found at the Field Museum of Natural History in Chicago.

Setting 
The book is set in East Africa. The nearest large city to the man-eater attacks is Mombasa, the largest city then and second largest city now in Kenya. The Tsavo man-eater attacks occurred while working on the Uganda Railway. The railway reached Lake Victoria at Port Florence, now Kisumu, which at that time was in Uganda territory. It was separate from railway developments elsewhere in East Africa, for instance in German-run Tanganyika.

The railway project was controversial and the British Press referred to it as "The Lunatic Express", as critics considered it a waste of funds, while supporters argued it was necessary for transportation of goods.

Plot 
Colonel John Patterson is to build a bridge in East Africa (later Kenya). While he is working on this, two man-eating lions show up. They will stop at nothing for a bite of human flesh and the first attempts to stalk, capture or keep them out of the camp fail.  They attack the camp hospital and kill a patient.  Even after the hospital is moved, one lion penetrates the thick, thorn fence called a boma built to protect it and drags the water carrier away to his death. In the course of hunting these lions, Patterson encounters a red spitting cobra, a rhinoceros, a hippopotamus, a pack of wild dogs, a wildebeest that faked dying, and a herd of zebra, of which he captured six. He also shoots a new type of antelope, T. oryx pattersonianus.   Eventually, the first lion is defeated by baiting it with a tethered donkey while Patterson keeps watch from an elevated stand – though for a few tense moments Patterson himself becomes the hunted.  Patterson and Mahina hunt the second lion on the plains.  When they find and shoot it, the lion charges them and it takes repeated shots to bring it down.

The lions are not the only challenge to completing the bridge project. Tensions between native workers and Sikhs brought in from British East India to work on the project (coolies) threaten to stop the project.  At one point, Patterson meets a danger far greater than the lions – a fierce flood. It wipes out the supply bridges and wraps iron girders around tree trunks like wire. Uprooted tree trunks act like battering rams trying to annihilate the bridge.  But the well-built bridge stays intact. This challenge proves that the year spent working on the bridge has not been wasted.

Some time after Patterson completes the bridge, he learns of the death of his friend, Railway Police Superintendent Charles H. Ryall. Ryall had learned of a man-eating lion preying on railway staff at Kima station, notably an incident where it had tried to break through the station's roof. In response, he went to Kima with two companions, intending to shoot the lion before it attacked again. Ryall set up an ambush from his personal railway carriage, but saw nothing, and, perhaps deciding that the lion would not appear, retired for the night. Later that night, the man-eater broke into Ryall's carriage. The three hunters were in the main compartment, and an uncertain number of coolies in the adjoining one. The lion went for Ryall immediately, standing on one of his companions in order to get to him. The third man, in an effort to get to the other section, leapt onto the lion's back, and tried desperately to open the door. The coolies, who had been holding the door shut with their turbans, opened it just wide enough for him to get through, and then tied it shut again. Immediately afterwards, the lion leapt out the window with Ryall, leaving the remaining hunter to seek refuge in the station.  Some time later, a member of the railway staff trapped the lion, which was displayed alive for several days, then shot.

Another close encounter with a lion occurs when a lion is aboard a gharri, a means of transportation in Kenya similar to a small trolley. Another time, on the way back to the train station, Patterson converses with a friend who has never shot a lion. A couple of hundred yards away, Patterson points out a pair of lions and encourages the friend to shoot them. One runs off at the first shot, but he successfully bags the other lion. The end of the book includes a photo of the lion that the friend killed.

When the time comes for Patterson to leave, some of the coolies and the natives want to go with him. However, Patterson knows that they do not have the immune defense system to combat the diseases outside of Africa. So he politely says no and leaves Africa for some years. (He later returns to Africa, but this part of his life is not recorded in this book.)

Characters

The lions 

Cast 
John Patterson is the author and main character in the book. At that time, he was a lieutenant colonel in the British army trained as an engineer. He was also an experienced big-game hunter. Others include the following:

Mr. Anderson, superintendent of the railroad.
Dr. McCulloch, medical person in charge.
Dr. John Alexander ('Ian') Rose is a medical officer and friend of Patterson.
Dr. Brock, friend and fellow hunter.

"Coolies" was the term used for Indian laborers brought in from British India to work on the railroad. Many stayed in East Africa after the completion of the project.

Heera Sing, a worker who nearly gets smashed by a falling rock.
Purshotam Huree, overseer of the building of the railroad.
Karim Bux, a troublemaker whose scheme is exposed by Patterson.
Mr. Whitehead, District Officer, mauled by the lions.
Mr. Crawford is the British Consul.
Mr. Dalgairms, inspector who nearly gets mauled by a lion.
Abdullah, Mr. Whitehead's sergeant of askaris, killed by the lions.
Mr. Farquhar, member of a hunting party.
Mahina, Patterson's gun-boy.
Mabruki, the camp cook.
Moota, Muslim hunting assistant.
Mrs. O'Hara, whose husband is killed.
Roshan Khan, an assistant.
Spooner, Patterson's great friend.
Imam Din, Spooner's plucky servant.
Bhoota, a servant.
Mr. Ryall, Superintendent of the Railway Police, killed by a lion at Kima.
Mr. Huebner, companion of Ryall, escaped by jumping on the lion's back.
Mr. Parenti, companion of Ryall, stood on by the lion that killed Ryall.
Landaalu, a native guide.

Cultural influence 
Several media projects and studies of the man-eating lions of Tsavo have been inspired by Patterson's account.

See also 
 Tsavo Man-Eaters (the lions)

References 

 Kerbis Peterhans & Gnoske, 2001. The 'science of man-eating' among lions (Panthera leo) with a reconstruction of the natural history of the 'man-eaters of Tsavo'

External links 

The Man Eaters of Tsavo (Online Text)

The Man-Eaters of Tsavo and Other East African Adventures at the Internet Archive

National Geographic Story of the Tsavo Lions by Phillip and Robert Caputo, with extra photos, maps, and information
Photo Journal of 2005 Lion Research Trip to Kenya by Carl Palazzolo, DVM, and Dr. Bruce Patterson
Science Daily, 3 November, 2009: "Notorious 'Man-Eating' Lions of Tsavo Likely Ate About 35 People—Not 135, Scientists Say" abstract of National Academy of Sciences article

1907 non-fiction books
Macmillan Publishers books
Books about Kenya
Autobiographies adapted into films
British autobiographies
Books about lions